Mermen may refer to:

 The Mermen, a music group
Merman, male equivalent of a mermaid
 "1983... (A Merman I Should Turn To Be)", a Jimi Hendrix song